Altergeist (also known under its working title Sighting) is a 2014 science fiction horror film that was written and directed by Tedi Sarafian. The film had its world premiere on 25 August 2014 at the London FrightFest Film Festival and received a limited theatrical release in the United States on 7 November 2014. The film follows a group of paranormal investigators that find that trying to discover proof of the supernatural might be the death of them.

Plot

A group of six eager paranormal investigators have been allowed to explore King's Ransom Winery, a location with a history of strange suicides and a reputation for being haunted.

Cast
Kristina Anapau as Theresa
Mark Hapka as Dax
David Weidoff as Ashen Till
Linsey Godfrey as Sarah
Brendan Fletcher as Jason
Alexis Cruz as Mike
Sarah Oh as Maya
Olivia Stuck as Beatrice Blaine
Richard Sarafian Jr. as Jim till
Jessica Spotts as Rachel Till
Ed Corbin as Henry Blaine

Development
Plans to film Altergeist (then called Sighting) were first announced in 2011, and the film moved into post-production in November 2012. Michelle Rodriguez was initially set to star in the film, but later withdrew from filming. Sarafian took his inspiration for Altergeist from the Korbel Champagne Cellars in Guerneville, California, where Sarafian and producer Aaron Heck listened to stories about strange occurrences and a suicide in the winery's Korbel House, which also served as the set for Altergeist.

Reception

Grolsch Film Works praised Altergeist, writing that it "fully exploits its unusual vineyard setting, makes fun of its own hackneyed tropes..., and finds novel ways to reverse-engineer an apparent ghost story into something with a rather different genre frame." Fangoria gave the film three out of four skulls, writing that "Despite its dark setting and often fairly horrific murder sequences, ALTERGEIST is light hearted stuff, with clever banter and humor amongst the group of hunters, and actor Brendan Fletcher (FREDDY vs. JASON) being exceptionally funny throughout."

References

External links
 
 

2014 films
2014 horror films
Films shot in California
Films scored by Anthony Marinelli
2010s English-language films